Conjure One is the self-titled debut album by Canadian electronic music project Conjure One, headed by Rhys Fulber. It was released on September 17, 2002 through Nettwerk.

Background
Being a long-time collaborator of Canadian musician Bill Leeb in the bands Front Line Assembly and Delerium, Fulber had a worldwide hit with the single "Silence" in 1999 with the latter. According to their own figures, Nettwerk sold 1 million copies of the album Karma from which the single was taken. Backed by the success, Fulber decided to release solo material. "Once you have a big song, people listen to what you have to say," he said to Billboard and expressed satisfaction with the label's backing: "Nettwerk was very supportive and has been very patient with me."

Production
Due to other production and remixing responsibilities it took Fulber three years to finish the album. About his approach to writing the album he said, "I like the concept of pop music. It's more challenging to write songs than to write ambient music."

Release
The song "Center of the Sun" is featured in the 2003 American superhero film X2.

Track listing

Personnel

Conjure One
 Rhys Fulber – programming, production

Additional musicians
 Chemda – vocals (1, 4, 6), sampled vocals (7)
 Jamie Muhoberac – additional keyboard (1, 3)
 Poe – vocals (2, 8), recording (2, 8)
 Junkie XL – additional programming (2, 5, 8, 10), additional production (4, 10), mixing (4, 6, 10), additional keyboard (4), recording (8), guitar (8)
 Jeff Martin – acoustic guitar (2, 9), esraj (6), bowed guitar (6), vocals (11)
 Sinéad O'Connor – vocals (3)
 Rick Nowels – keyboard (3), chamberlin (3), acoustic guitar (3), electric guitar (3), production (3)
 Ralph Morrison – violin (3)
 Carmen Rizzo – mixing (1, 5, 7–9), additional programming (3, 5, 7, 9), digital editing
 Tim Pierce – additional guitar (3)
 Curt Bisquera – additional percussion (3)
 Ashwin Sood – live drums (4–6), live percussion (4, 6, 9)
 Marie-Claire D'Ubaldo – vocals (5, 10)
 Chris Elliott – string arrangement (5, 7, 9–11), grand piano (5, 8–11), piano (7), conducting
 Joanna Stevens – additional vocals (5, 11)
 Mel Garside – additional vocals (9)
 Sean Ashby – steel guitar (10)
 Vancouver Symphony Orchestra – strings performance

Technical personnel
 Mike Plotnikoff – recording (1, 2, 4–6, 8–11), mixing (11)
 Greg Reely – mixing (2)
 Brian Reeves – mixing (3)
 Randy Wine – recording (3)
 Chris Garcia – recording (3)
 Blair Calibaba – recording (4–6, 8, 9)
 Mike Landolt – recording (5, 10)
 Graeme Stewart – recording (9)
 Paul Silveira – digital editing
 Greg Collins – digital editing
 Alex Aligizakis – digital editing
 Zack Blackstone – assistant engineering
 Charlie Thiebaud – assistant engineering
 Ted Jensen – mastering
 Olaf Heine – photography
 John Rummen – sleeve design
 Mike Goldwater – front cover photo

Charts

Singles

Sleep

Tears from the Moon

Center of the Sun

References

2002 debut albums
Conjure One albums
Nettwerk Records albums
Worldbeat albums